The Red Baron (also known by its original German title, Der Rote Baron) is a 2008 German-British biographical action war film written and directed by Nikolai Müllerschön about the World War I flying ace Manfred von Richthofen, known as the "Red Baron". The film stars Matthias Schweighöfer, Joseph Fiennes, Til Schweiger and Lena Headey. The Red Baron was filmed entirely in English to improve its international commercial viability.

Plot
In 1916, Manfred von Richthofen is serving as a fighter pilot with the Imperial German Air Service along the Western Front. After dropping a wreath over the funeral of an Allied pilot, Richthofen and his fellow pilots Werner Voss and Friedrich Sternberg encounter a squadron of the Royal Flying Corps led by Captain Lanoe Hawker. Richthofen shoots down Canadian pilot Arthur Roy Brown. After pulling Brown out of the wreckage of his aircraft, Richthofen assists Nurse Käte Otersdorf with a tourniquet on Brown's leg.

After killing Hawker, Richthofen is awarded the Pour le Mérite medal and promoted to command a squadron. He is joined by his brother Lothar von Richthofen (Volker Bruch). He orders his men to avoid killing enemy pilots unless absolutely necessary and is dismayed when Lothar deliberately strafes and kills a British pilot who has already been forced into a landing.

Later, during an aerial dogfight, Richthofen again encounters Captain Brown, who has escaped from a German prisoner of war camp after being nursed by Käte. Both are forced to ditch their aircraft in no man's land, where they share a friendly drink. Brown expresses hope that they will not meet again until after the war is over, and he tells Richthofen that Käte has feelings for him.

On the way back to base, Richthofen is devastated to learn that his close friend, the Jewish pilot Friedrich Sternberg, has been shot down and killed. Over the days that follow, Richthofen makes no secret of his grief and refuses to leave his room. An enraged Lothar reminds him that, "A leader cannot afford to mourn."

Shortly thereafter, Richthofen suffers a skull wound during an aerial battle, and is sent to be nursed by Käte. As he recovers, the two share a romantic dinner and a dance. After Richthofen expresses gratitude for his wound keeping him out of the fighting, an angry Käte takes him on a tour of a local field hospital, berating him for regarding the war as a game.

Later, Richthofen and Käte are beginning to make love when they are interrupted by an Allied bombing raid. Determined to protect the squadron's aircraft, he orders Käte to hide in the cellar and takes to the air with his men. During the raid, Richthofen's wound begins to reopen, making him disoriented, and upon witnessing the combat death of his protege Kurt Wolff, he goes into a state of rage in the air.

During another visit, Richthofen informs Käte that he has been offered a rear echelon position in command of the entire Air Service. Käte is overjoyed, but a depressed Richthofen conceals his doubts. Richthofen sees he is being manipulated by the Kaiser and his generals. While visiting the Fokker Industries Richtofen discovers that Werner Voss, the most competitive pilot of the squadron after him and his dear friend, died in a dogfight, thus leaving the squadron with very few experienced pilots. On the eve of the Spring Offensive, he approaches Field Marshal Paul von Hindenburg and tells him that the war is now unwinnable, however, Hindenburg orders him back to his squadron. Caught between his disgust for the war, and the responsibility for his fighter wing, Richthofen sets out to fly again.

As the offensive begins, Richthofen's squadron sets out to clear every Allied aeroplane and balloon out of the target area. As Käte tends the wounded on the ground, she is horrified to learn that her beloved has returned to combat. Käte confronts him and demands to know why he has turned down the chance to remain safe. Richthofen states that he will not betray the soldiers in the field by remaining "the immortal god that Berlin wants me to be". He says, "You are my greatest victory."

On April 21, 1918, Richthofen is wakened with the report of a British formation approaching the front, after making love to Käte. He has a brief talk with his pilots and, along with Lothar, advises his newly arrived and inexperienced cousin Wolfram von Richthofen against putting himself in unnecessary danger. As Richthofen climbs into his cockpit, he exchanges a sad smile with Käte.

Much later, Käte crosses over to Allied lines with Brown's assistance and visits Richthofen's grave. She apologizes for not coming sooner and expresses remorse for never telling him how much she loved him. A funeral wreath has been left by Captain Brown, reading "To Manfred von Richthofen, Friend and Enemy."

Cast
In credits order. 
 Matthias Schweighöfer as Rittmeister Manfred Freiherr von Richthofen
 Lena Headey as Nurse Käte Otersdorf
 Til Schweiger as Leutnant Werner Voss
 Volker Bruch as Oberleutnant Lothar Freiherr von Richthofen
 Maxim Mehmet as Leutnant Friedrich Sternberg
 Hanno Koffler as Leutnant Lohmann
 Tino Mewes as Oberleutnant Kurt Wolff
 Steffen Schroeder as Oberleutnant Karl Bodenschatz
 Axel Prahl as General der Kavallerie Ernst von Hoeppner
 Joseph Fiennes as "Captain" Roy Brown "RCFC"
 Tomáš Koutník as Young Manfred von Richthofen
 Tomáš Ibl as Young Lothar von Richthofen
 Albert Franc as Young Wolfram Freiherr von Richthofen
 Richard Krajčo as Major Lanoe Hawker VC RFC
 Lukáš Příkazký as Oberleutnant Stefan Kirmaier
 Gitta Schweighöfer as Kunigunde von Richthofen
 Branislav Holiček as Leutnant Wolfram Freiherr von Richthofen
 Julie Engelbrecht as Ilse von Richthofen
 Jan Vlasák as Major Albrecht Freiherr von Richthofen
 Luise Bähr as Sophie
 Irena Máchová as Clara
 Robert Nebřenský as Feldwebel Räuber
 Ralph Misske as Menzke
 Josef Vinklář as Generalfeldmarschall Paul von Hindenburg
 Ladislav Frej as Kaiser Wilhelm II
 Patrik Plesinger as Hauptmann Doering
 Jiří Laštovka as Oberleutnant Ernst Udet
 Rostislav Novák as Oberleutnant Erich Loewenhardt
 Zdeněk Pecha as Leutnant Werner Steinhäuser
 Jiří Kout as Leutnant Eberhard Mohnicke
 Karsten Kaie as Anthony Fokker

Production
A shooting schedule from 10 July 2006 to 3 October 2006 took place in the Czech Republic at Prague and surrounding areas as well as locations in France and Baden-Württemberg, Germany. In Postproduction, CGI was carried out by PIXOMONDO.

To improve its chances on the international market, The Red Baron was filmed by Niama Film in the English language, although it is a German production depicting Germans. With an estimated budget of 18 million euros, it is one of the most expensive and at the same time lowest-grossing films in German history.

Fewer than 100,000 saw the film in the first week, causing the film to miss the Top 3. In the second week it dropped to No. 10. In the third week the film was gone from the top ten.

Reception
The Red Baron premiered on 31 March 2008 in Berlin and was released a week later in the German cinemas but was quite controversial in Germany, where glorification of war heroes has become taboo. The reviews after the first public performances of the film were mainly negative, criticizing in particular the high level of historical inaccuracy. The fictitious love story between Richthofen and Käte Otersdorf was described as having little factual basis. The film received a cool reception at the Berlin premiere and one member of the audience stated that Richthofen's disillusion with the war was not believable.

Reviewing the movie, Manfred von Richthofen, the Baron's nephew said "It's a remarkable movie". "Somehow it did not turn into a war film. The personality and especially the thoughtfulness of my uncle are true to life." Richthofen biographer Joachim Castan, called Richthofen's and Otersdorf's affair "complete rubbish"; "The historical Richthofen was the James Dean of World War I, an idol of his time, but he had no affairs with women. He also did not drink and did not visit brothels." And it is true that on three occasions he waved his enemy to the ground rather than shooting them out of the sky. (In one case, seeing that an enemy pilot's gun had jammed, Von Richthofen waved him down to the ground, jumped out, shook his hand and then took off again.) But in other respects, Von Richthofen was "cold-blooded," says Castan. "He was mainly interested in his strike rate. He did not try to conceal the fact that he was aiming to kill."

Both Tino Mewes as Best Young Supporting Actor and Matthias Schweighöfer as Best Young Actor from The Red Baron were nominated for Undine Awards.

See also
Flyboys (film)
Von Richthofen and Brown

References

Notes

Citations

Bibliography

 Beck, Simon D. The Aircraft Spotter's Film and Television Companion. Jefferson, North Carolina, 2016. .

External links

Official
 Official Website (flash)
 Red Baron - The movie channel on YouTube
 The Red Baron on Blogger
 Official U.S. Website

Press
 Pricey 'Red Baron' recalls war exploits, Ed Meza, Variety.com
 After 88 years, the Red Baron is flying high again, Timesonline.co.uk [archived]
 Roland Castan "The Death of a Legend, the Birth of a Mythology" (In German)

2008 films
2000s war films
2000s adventure drama films
Anti-war films about World War I
2000s German-language films
2000s English-language films
English-language German films
2000s French-language films
Films set in 1906
Films set in 1916
Films set in 1917
Films set in 1918
Films set in France
Films set in Germany
Films set in Belgium
Films set in Berlin
Films set in Lille
World War I aviation films
2000s biographical films
World War I films based on actual events
War romance films
Films about shot-down aviators
Films shot in France
Films shot in Germany
Films shot in Prague
Western Front (World War I) films
British World War I films
German World War I films
Cultural depictions of Manfred von Richthofen
Cultural depictions of Wilhelm II
Cultural depictions of Paul von Hindenburg
Cultural depictions of Anthony Fokker
Biographical films about military personnel
2008 drama films
2000s British films
2000s German films